The Portlands Energy Centre is a 550-megawatt natural gas electrical generating station in Toronto, Ontario. It is located in the Port Lands area of the Toronto waterfront at 470 Unwin Avenue, adjacent to the site of the decommissioned Hearn Generating Station.

Ownership
The Portlands Energy Centre was originally owned and operated as a 50/50 joint partnership between Ontario Power Generation (OPG) and TransCanada Corporation (now TC Energy). OPG acquired full ownership of the facility in 2020, and it is currently operated by OPG's subsidiary Atura Power.

Technical specifications of the plant
The technical specifications of the plant in the original submission of the environmental review report (a less rigorous form of a full environmental assessment) to the Ministry of the Environment in November 2003 have been significantly altered. This was due to the government instructing Ontario Power Generation to stop participating in projects which use more environmentally acceptable generations systems, such as co-generation.  Originally, the plant was described as two identical 275 MW power train systems, each comprising a 175 MW GE 7FA gas turbine generator, and other equipment. This proposed configuration was capable of producing over 272,000 per hour of steam for district heating. This design would, according to a PEC newsletter, allow for the efficiency of the plant to be “about 55% compared to 35% for a typical fossil power plant” There were also plans to include “Canada’s largest solar array” capable of producing “hundreds of kilowatts” though no actual specification seems to have ever been given.

Local opposition

Environmental issues
The original design met with some community resistance and many local residents, all local politicians and a number of significant City of Toronto departments including the Works Department and the Board of Health. These groups called for a full Environmental Assessment (EA) as a way to resolve some of the technical and health related issues with the plant. The Ontario Liberal Government denied a full EA. Over time, the plan was altered significantly in a way that reduced the efficiency and aesthetic virtues of the plant. In November 2004, the proponents hosted a meeting to tell the community that the generation of steam for district heating was no longer going to happen and that the solar panels were no longer going to be included.  It was also noted that the attempts to make the exterior of the plant aesthetically pleasing had been dropped in favour of a shed type design.

Location issues
The plant was met with considerable local opposition, since it was to be sited on the Waterfront, which is currently undergoing a revitalization process, and has been striving to be a “world leader in sustainable design” (according to the Corporation Chair, Robert Fung). The Ontario Liberal Government decided that, despite significant opposition, the project would be allowed to move forward without a full Environmental Assessment. The Toronto Waterfront Revitalization Corporation played a more neutral role, offering criticism of the plant but falling short of calling for a change of plans.

Power purchase agreement, timing and capital costs
On September 18, 2006, TransCanada issued a press release announcing that Portlands Energy Centre L.P. had signed a 20-year Accelerated Clean Energy Supply (ACES) contract with the Ontario Power Authority for the power output of the PEC.

The plant started delivering 340 MW of power to the City of Toronto in June 2008 in single-cycle operation and was fully operational with an output of 550 MW by the second-quarter 2009.  Total capital costs are expected to reach $730MM.

See also

 Toronto waterfront
 Port Lands
 Toronto Hydro - City owned electricity distribution corporation
 Ontario Power Generation - Provincially owned electricity generation corporation
 Hearn Generating Station - The original electrical generation facility
 Toronto Port Authority - Federal government agency that controls the portlands

References

External links
 Portlands Energy Centre
 Top Plants: Portlands Energy Centre, Ontario, Canada
 Portlands Energy Centre Photos - 2007

Ontario Power Generation
Buildings and structures in Toronto
Natural gas-fired power stations in Ontario
Joint ventures
TC Energy
2008 establishments in Ontario